Estadio El Montecillo is a multi-use stadium in Aranda de Duero, Spain. It is currently used mostly for football matches. The stadium holds 6,000 people.

References

External links
Estadios de España 

Football venues in Castile and León
Buildings and structures in the Province of Burgos
Sports venues completed in 1977
Sport in Aranda de Duero